Zeenat may refer to:

People
 Zeenat Aman (born 1951), Indian actress
 Zeenat Begum (died 1966), Indian/Pakistani classical singer
 Zeenat Karzai (born 1970), wife of previous Afghanistan President Hamid Karzai
 Zeenat-un-Nissa, (1681-1721), Mughal empress 
 Zeenat Mahal (1823-1886), last Mughal empress
 Zeenat Barkatullah, Bangladeshi dancer and actress

Media
 Zeenat (1945 film), a 1945  Indian film starring Noor Jehan 
 Zeenat (1975 film), a 1975 Pakistani film